Parirazona caracae is a species of moth of the family Tortricidae. It is found in Minas Gerais, Brazil.

The dorsal half of the wings (from the base to the tornus) and costal half of the wings are whitish brown, strigulated (finely streaked) and suffused with brown. The wings are brown in the middle and at the costa terminally. The colour is paler and more white postbasally. The posterior portion of the wings is white with greyish strigulae. The hindwings are whitish, slightly tinged with brownish and strigulated with pale brown.

Etymology
The species name refers to the type locality, Caraca.

References

Moths described in 2007
Cochylini